Transylvania 6-5000 (1963) is a Warner Bros. Merrie Melodies animated short directed by Chuck Jones. The short was released on November 30, 1963, and stars Bugs Bunny. It was the last original Bugs Bunny short Jones made for Warner Bros. Cartoons before Jones left for Metro-Goldwyn-Mayer to found his own studio, Sib Tower 12 Productions. It was his second-to-last cartoon at Warner Bros. before moving to MGM, and the second-to-last Warner cartoon in 1963.

Bugs demonstrates how to handle a pesky vampire with six simple magic incantations.

Plot
Bugs is traveling by tunneling underground—and runs straight into a tree.  He heads for Pittsburgh, Pennsylvania, as he observes "these Pennsylvania hardwoods ain't too soft!", but he does not immediately notice that a sign nailed to the tree reads "Pittsburghe, Transylvania". He asks a two-headed female vulture (Agatha and Emily) for directions to "Pittsboig" when he realizes that he has not reached the Steel City, but Agatha and Emily are too busy talking about eating him. Bugs leaves them to it, sees an old castle nearby, mistakes it for a motel and calmly approaches it. Upon ringing a skull/chime doorbell (playing "The Hearse Song") Bugs meets a vampire, who introduces himself as Count Bloodcount and invites him in. Although Bugs is only looking for a telephone to call his travel agency, the Count leads him to a guest room beckoning him to rest, informing him that "Rest is good for the blood.".

Unable to sleep, Bugs picks up a book titled Magic Words and Phrases, and despite his initial skepticism about their effect, he reads it. The Count sneaks up behind him and is just about to strike when Bugs says "abracadabra", turning the Count into a bat. Bugs mistakes the bat/Count for a big mosquito and clobbers him with a fly swatter. As the bat dizzily flies out of the window, Bugs says "hocus pocus", which turns the Count back into a vampire and causes him to fall into the moat surrounding his castle. Agatha and Emily wonder what a splendid-looking specimen the Count is as they watch him take the plunge.

Shortly afterward, while Bugs is searching for the house restaurant, the Count sneaks up from behind again, but Bugs is humming to the tune of "It's Magic", substituting "abracadabra" for some of the lyrics, and inadvertently turns the Count back into a bat. Once again mistaking the bat for a mosquito, Bugs sprays the bat with a fumigator. As the bat/Count is hanging his head down from an archway, coughing insecticide out of his lungs, Bugs sings "hocus pocus" during a continuation of his song, and the Count crashes to the floor on his head.

Fed up with the situation, the Count confronts Bugs and reveals his true identity as a vampire, resulting in a duel of "magic phrases" in which Bugs transforms into a baseball umpire. He then turns himself into a baseball bat when the count turns himself into a bat (with "hocus pocus" strangely enough) to hit the bat-vampire on the head (despite the Count putting on glasses in a futile attempt to keep Bugs from doing so). Bugs gets the best of the Count for the rest of the duel by saying "abracadabra" every time the vampire says "hocus pocus", causing him to be crushed repeatedly by a stone slab from the floor that the Count intended to crush Bugs with. By mixing the magic words to "abraca-pocus" and "hocus-cadabra", Bugs causes the Count to become a mixture of human and bat body parts. Afterward he uses "Newport News" and turns him into Witch Hazel. Unimpressed ("Wow, I can do better than that"), he uses the incantation "Walla Walla, Washington", and the Count is turned into a two-headed male vulture. Bugs calls out to Agatha and Emily, and the Count soon finds himself the object of their romantic intentions. The Count flees the castle with the female vulture in amorous pursuit as Bugs watches in amusement.

Bugs finally finds a working pay phone (in a coffin), but while waiting for the operator to reach his travel agency in Perth Amboy, he once again sings "It's Magic", this time substituting "abraca-pocus", which causes his ears to turn into bat wings. Bugs tells the operator to cancel the call, hangs up, and decides to fly home with his new wings.

Voice Cast
Mel Blanc as Bugs Bunny
Ben Frommer as Count Bloodcount
Julie Bennett as Agatha and Emily, the Two-Headed Vulture

References in other media

Count Bloodcount also reappeared in the video game Bugs Bunny and Taz Time Busters as the final boss.

Count Bloodcount also appeared in the Tiny Toon Adventures episode "Stuff That Goes Bump in the Night" in the segment "Fang You Very Much", where he is adopted by Elmyra Duff while disguised as a bat. In this, the Count repeatedly tries to bite Elmyra in his vampire form, but any time the Count is exposed to light, he turns back into a bat.

The Tiny Toons version of the Count also appears as a boss character in the video game Tiny Toon Adventures: Buster Busts Loose!.

The song "Dracula" by Gorillaz, a bonus track on their eponymous debut album, samples portions of the short where the Count states "I am a vampire!" and "rest is good for the blood".

Portions of the cartoon were used in the 1977's Bugs Bunny's Howl-oween Special, which repurposed classic Looney Tunes cartoons in a new storyline. In the special, Bugs Bunny gave Witch Hazel a bottle of Hyde formula, which transformed her into Count Bloodcount, leading to her stalking Bugs through her home in reused footage from Transylvania 6-5000 and trying to catch him. When Bugs uses the spell "Newport News", she remains as Witch Hazel for the special's final act. Witch Hazel voice actress June Foray re-dubbed Count Bloodcount in scenes incorporating his dialogue.

Most of the cartoon was used in Daffy Duck's Quackbusters, but some dialogue was redubbed to connect it to the film's main story. Also, the end was changed so that instead of Bugs sprouting bat wings and flying away, he reports his findings to Daffy Duck (although he still sings "abraca-pocus" to himself while in the coffin phone-booth, but the film cuts away before his ears transform), who is displeased to hear from him (saying "What do you think we're running here, a matrimonial agency?!"). Later, Bugs is seen leaving the castle from the cartoon before he answers a nearby payphone as part of the link to the cartoon The Abominable Snow Rabbit.

Count Bloodcount appeared in The Sylvester and Tweety Mysteries episode "Fangs for the Memories". He was voiced by Corey Burton.

Count Bloodcount also appears in Looney Tunes Collector: Alert! as a boss character. After the player defeats him, he decides to become an NPC ally of Bugs to find some opportunities in blood.

See also
List of American films of 1963
List of Bugs Bunny cartoons

References

External links

1963 films
1963 animated films
1963 short films
Merrie Melodies short films
American vampire films
Short films directed by Chuck Jones
Bugs Bunny films
Films about shapeshifting
Films set in castles
Films set in Transylvania
1963 comedy films
Films directed by Maurice Noble
Vampires in animated film
Films scored by William Lava
1960s Warner Bros. animated short films
1960s English-language films